
Dogdyke is a hamlet in the North Kesteven district of Lincolnshire, England.

Community
Dogdyke is part of the civil parish of Dogdyke with Chapel Hill within the district of North Kesteven and is within the ecclesiastical parish of Billinghay.  The civil parish also includes nearby Tattershall Bridge, where the A153 crosses the Witham. Nearby settlements are the hamlets of Chapel Hill and Tattershall Bridge, and Hawthorn Hill to which Dogdyke is conjoined.

The Chapel of St Nicholas was located at Dogdyke in the 14th century, and was mentioned in 1342. It has long since vanished and its location has not been found. Dogdyke appears as "Dokedyke" in the 14th century, and fell within the ancient wapentake of Langoe.

The hamlet has two public houses, a caravan park and a marina.

Drainage
The first drainage pump at Dogdyke was built in 1796 and was wind-powered. It was replaced in 1856 by the Dogdyke Pumping Station which was driven by steam, and later by diesel.

Dogdyke  falls within the drainage area of the Witham Third District Internal Drainage Board.

Chapel Hill, on the opposite west bank of the Witham, falls within the drainage area of the Witham First District Internal Drainage Board.

See also
 Dogdyke railway station
 Dogdyke Engine

Further reading
Marlowe, Christopher: The Fen Country, Cecil Palmer, London (1925)

References

External links

"Dogdyke", Genuki.org.uk. Retrieved 7 July 2013
"Dogdyke steam drainage station", Dogdyke.com. Retrieved 7 July 2013

Hamlets in Lincolnshire
Civil parishes in Lincolnshire
North Kesteven District